Fastpoint Games was a developer of data-driven games for businesses in the fortune 500, and was the parent company of fantasy sports developer, RotoHog. Under the Fastpoint Games banner, the company had applied RotoHog's configurable game platform to use structured data to drive consumer engagement and help brands in markets like social media, entertainment, MMO, politics and regulated gaming to grow their audience, engage their users and monetize them.

On 7 January 2011, Fastpoint Games and Sony Online Entertainment announced the alpha launch of the Facebook game Fortune League.  The casual strategy game is based on the world of EverQuest II (EQII).  In Fortune League, players assess quests, hero performance, situational threats and the actions of other players in a live trade market and compensates leaders with points, cosmetic upgrades and prizes that can be used in the free-to-play and subscription versions of EQII.  Fortune League integrates real-time performance data such as damages, deaths and healings directly from the MMO environment and uses them to form Hero Stats that drive the game.  Therefore, player actions inside EQII will affect what happens in Fortune League and prizes from Fortune League will help users advance back in the EQII environment.  Fastpoint Games CEO, Kelly Perdew, positions Fortune League as a new category of snackable data-driven games that will help MMO franchises acquire users and tap new revenue streams.

On 11 July 2011, Fortune League was sunsetted.

Between September 2009 and November 2010, the company has leveraged its technology platform to power games outside of the fantasy sports segment and launched games in the entertainment and casual games space. They have partnered with social media platforms including hi5, Facebook and MySpace, and released 58 games for 16 clients across 21 sports and entertainment seasons for marquee clients including US Weekly, NASCAR, ABC, Los Angeles Times, Go Daddy.com and Sports Illustrated online.

Weplay Acquired the assets of Fastpoint Games in May 2012, but the games and domains did not continue.

See also 
RotoHog
Fantasy Sports

References

External links
Official Site
Fastpoint Games' Fantasy Sports Site - rotohog.com

Privately held companies based in Delaware
Companies established in 2006